Toran Shumsher Jung Bahadur Rana was the first police chief of Nepal Police after its establishment in the year 2007 B.S. (1951 A.D.) However, he only remained chief for a short duration of three days. He was succeeded by Nara Shumsher J.B.R. as the police chief.

He also served as the Royal Nepalese Army's Commander-in-Chief from 1956–1960.

He was later succeeded by Gen Nir Shumsher Jung Bahadur Rana who later on became field marshal.

Biography 
Toran Shumsher Jung Bahadur Rana was born in 1904 A.D. at the Hattisar Durbar, son of Commanding Colonel Indra Shumsher Jung Bahadur Rana and Grandson of the late H.H Bir Shumsher Jang Bahadur Rana, the 11th Prime Minister of Nepal.

References

Nepalese police officers
Chiefs of police
Inspectors General of Police (Nepal)
1904 births
Year of death unknown
Rana dynasty
20th-century Nepalese nobility